Vohidov is a surname. Notable people with the surname include:

Abdumuqit Vohidov, Tajikistani Guantanomo detainee
Asror Vohidov (born 1995), Tajikistani boxer
Erkin Vohidov (1936–2016), Uzbek poet, playwright, translator, and statesman